FC Arsenal-Kyivshchyna Bila Tserkva was a Ukrainian professional team from Bila Tserkva in Kyiv Oblast. Previous name was FC Arsenal Bila Tserkva until June 2013.

History
The football club was formed in 2006 and entered the Ukrainian Second League in 2007. The football club is part of a bigger sports club "ArsenalBC" based in Bila Tserkva and which specialized in triathlon events and well as cross country running and bicycle racing.

In 2009 FC Arsenal was promoted to the Ukrainian First League via a playoff game. While based in Bila Tserkva, FC Arsenal also plays its games in Obukhiv which is located closer to Kyiv.

The club was relegated to the Ukrainian Second League after the 2012–13 season.

Stadium and grounds
The club's training grounds are located in the village of Shkarivka, Kyiv Oblast around six miles (10 km) away from Bila Tserkva. Its main sponsor is one of the biggest furniture companies in Ukraine, the owner of which is the president of the club, Yuriy Horobets. Until the 2009–2010 season its home games the club were played in the neighboring city of Obukhiv, Kyiv Oblast. Finally the administration of the club managed to lease the locally available municipal stadium, Trudovi Reservy (the Central Children-Youth Sport Arena "Trudovi Reservy"), in Bila Tserkva for the 2009–2010 season. After the club's promotion to the First League, the club was allowed also to use the stadium for some training, although for a limited time.

Trudovi Reservy has an electronic display and some stadium roofing. The stadium is the property of the city and is co-sponsored by the regional football federation, Kyiv Oblast Football Federation along with the city administration. The stadium is primarily designated for the development of the amateur football, in particular the youth teams.

Arsenal bought its own city's sport grounds in 2009 for the construction of its home arena, which is forecasted to have a capacity of 5,000 people. The construction of its playing grounds started in 2009. The club's colours are red and white.

League and cup history

{|class="wikitable"
|-bgcolor="#efefef"
! Season
! Div.
! Pos.
! Pl.
! W
! D
! L
! GS
! GA
! P
!Domestic Cup
!colspan=2|Europe
!Notes
|-bgcolor=PowderBlue
|align=center|2007
|align=center|4th
|align=center|4
|align=center|8
|align=center|2
|align=center|3
|align=center|3
|align=center|8
|align=center|6
|align=center|9
|align=center|
|align=center|
|align=center|
|align=center bgcolor=lightgreen|
|-bgcolor=PowderBlue
|align=center|2007–08
|align=center|3rd "A"
|align=center|7
|align=center|30
|align=center|13
|align=center|7
|align=center|10
|align=center|28
|align=center|31
|align=center|46
|align=center|1/64 finals
|align=center|
|align=center|
|align=center|
|-bgcolor=PowderBlue
|align=center|2008–09
|align=center|3rd "A"
|align=center bgcolor=silver|2
|align=center|32
|align=center|21
|align=center|4
|align=center|7
|align=center|51
|align=center|30
|align=center|67
|align=center|1/32 finals
|align=center|
|align=center|
|align=center bgcolor=lightgreen|
|-bgcolor=LightCyan
|align=center|2009–10
|align=center|2nd
|align=center|9
|align=center|34
|align=center|12
|align=center|10
|align=center|12
|align=center|48
|align=center|44
|align=center|46
|align=center|1/32 finals
|align=center|
|align=center|
|align=center|
|-bgcolor=LightCyan
|align=center|2010–11
|align=center|2nd
|align=center|9
|align=center|34
|align=center|15
|align=center|6
|align=center|13
|align=center|42
|align=center|43
|align=center|51
|align=center|1/16 finals
|align=center|
|align=center|
|align=center|
|-bgcolor=LightCyan
|align=center|2011–12
|align=center|2nd
|align=center|4
|align=center|34
|align=center|18
|align=center|8
|align=center|8
|align=center|51
|align=center|39
|align=center|62
|align=center|1/16 finals
|align=center|
|align=center|
|align=center|
|-bgcolor=LightCyan
|align=center|2012–13
|align=center|2nd
|align=center|18
|align=center|34 	
|align=center|5 	
|align=center|5 	
|align=center|24 	
|align=center|23 	
|align=center|76 	
|align=center|20
|align=center|1/32 finals
|align=center|
|align=center|
|align=center bgcolor=pink|
|-bgcolor=PowderBlue
|align=center|2013–14
|align=center|3rd
|align=center|15
|align=center|36
|align=center|9
|align=center|7
|align=center|20
|align=center|27
|align=center|57
|align=center|34
|align=center|1/32 finals
|align=center|
|align=center|
|align=center|
|-bgcolor=PowderBlue
|align=center|2014–15
|align=center|3rd
|align=center|9
|align=center|27 	
|align=center|6 	
|align=center|2 	
|align=center|19 	
|align=center|14 	
|align=center|40
|align=center|20
|align=center|1/32 finals
|align=center|
|align=center|
|align=center|
|-bgcolor=PowderBlue
|align=center|2015–16
|align=center|3rd
|align=center|13
|align=center|26 	
|align=center|5 	
|align=center|	2 		
|align=center|19 	
|align=center|24 	
|align=center|56 	
|align=center|17
|align=center|1/32 finals
|align=center|
|align=center|
|align=center|
|-bgcolor=PowderBlue
|align=center|2016–17
|align=center|3rd
|align=center|15
|align=center|32 	
|align=center|7 	 	
|align=center|4 			
|align=center|21 	
|align=center|29 	
|align=center|82 	 	
|align=center|25 
|align=center|1/64 finals 
|align=center|
|align=center|
|align=center|
|-bgcolor=PowderBlue
|align=center|2017–18
|align=center|3rd
|align=center|10
|align=center|27	
|align=center|4	
|align=center|1		
|align=center|22	
|align=center|18
|align=center|62 	
|align=center|13 
|align=center|1/64 finals
|align=center|
|align=center|
|align=center align=center bgcolor=pink|
|}

Coaches
 2009–2012 Ihor Artymovych
 2012–2013 Oleh Lutkov
 2013–2013 Yevhen Feshchenko
 2013–2015 Vadym Mandrievskyi
 2015 Vitaliy Rozhon
 2016 Mykola Lytvyn (caretaker)
 2016–2017 Andriy Ushchapovskyi
 2017–2018 Oleksandr Akimov

Notes

References

See also
 FC Ros' Bila Tserkva

External links
 Official website of SC Arsenal (Bila Tserkva)

 
Association football clubs established in 2006
Association football clubs disestablished in 2018
Sport in Obukhiv
Football clubs in Bila Tserkva
Defunct football clubs in Ukraine
2006 establishments in Ukraine
2018 disestablishments in Ukraine